Korhogo Airport  is an airport serving Korhogo, Côte d'Ivoire. It is the country's fifth biggest airport.

Airlines and destinations

See also
Transport in Côte d'Ivoire

References

 OurAirports - Korhogo
 Great Circle Mapper - Korhogo
 Google Earth

Airports in Ivory Coast
Buildings and structures in Savanes District
Korhogo